Otman Djellilahine (born February 12, 1987 in Carcassonne, France) is a footballer who plays for Championnat National 2 side FC Gobelins.

International career
In 2004, France-born Djellilahine was called up by the Algerian Under-20 National Team for a week-long training camp capped off with a match against amateur side Le Grau du Roi.

References

External links
 
 France Football Profile
 

1987 births
Algerian footballers
Living people
French sportspeople of Algerian descent
Ligue 2 players
Championnat National players
Championnat National 2 players
Otman Djellilahine
Algerian Ligue Professionnelle 1 players
Nîmes Olympique players
FC Martigues players
US Créteil-Lusitanos players
CS Constantine players
Otman Djellilahine
Paris 13 Atletico players
Algeria youth international footballers
People from Carcassonne
Association football midfielders
Sportspeople from Aude
Expatriate footballers in Thailand
French footballers
Footballers from Occitania (administrative region)